Mikko Kalteva (born 25 May 1984) is a Finnish former professional ice hockey defenseman who most notably played in the Finnish Liiga.

Playing career
Kalteva was drafted 107th overall in the 2002 NHL Entry Draft by the Colorado Avalanche. Kalteva joined Jokerit as a 16-year-old junior and played in the Junior A SM-liiga in 2000–01 earning a place in the Pohjola First All-Star Team. Kalteva gained the notice of the Avalanche after selection to the Finnish Jr. team for the World U18 Championships in 2002. Kalteva was also named in the Finnish World Junior Championships in 2003 and 2004, earning a bronze medal on each occasion.

At the end of the 2003–04 season, Kalteva made his SM-liiga debut with Jokerit. In the following season Kalteva was a part of the fringe squad that helped Jokerit take the Silver medal in the Kanada-malja playoffs. Mikko became a duel winner of the Silver medal when he played a prominent defensive role in 2006–07.

On 23 April 2010, after spending his entire career to date with Jokerit, Kalteva left when he signed with Swedish team, Södertälje SK, of the Elitserien for the 2010–11 season.

Upon the completion of his second season with Södertälje, Kalteva returned to Finland signing a one-year contract with JYP Jyväskylä on 30 June 2012.

Kalteva played nine seasons with JYP Jyväskylä, making a total of 709 Liiga appearances before ending his 18-year professional career following the 2020–21 season, announcing his retirement on 31 March 2021.

Career statistics

Regular season and playoffs

International

References

External links

1984 births
Living people
Colorado Avalanche draft picks
Jokerit players
JYP Jyväskylä players
Södertälje SK players
People from Hyvinkää
Finnish ice hockey defencemen
Sportspeople from Uusimaa